Smart Arridge (21 June 1872 – 19 October 1947) was a footballer who played in the Football League for Bootle, Everton, New Brighton Tower and Stockport County. He also played for Wales.

References

1872 births
1947 deaths
Footballers from Sunderland
People from Wallasey
Association football fullbacks
English footballers
Wales international footballers
Bangor City F.C. players
Bootle F.C. (1879) players
Everton F.C. players
New Brighton Tower F.C. players
Stockport County F.C. players
English Football League players
Welsh footballers